Waiting on a Song is the second studio album by American musician Dan Auerbach. The album was released on June 2, 2017, and is the first release from Easy Eye Sound, Auerbach's label.

Critical reception

Waiting on a Song received generally positive reviews from critics. At Metacritic, which assigns a normalized rating out of 100 to reviews from mainstream publications, the album received an average score of 75, based on 19 reviews.

Single
The title track of the album was released as a single in the UK in June 2017 with a video directed by Bryan Schlam and featuring John Prine and Pat McLaughlin in cameo roles.

Track listing

Charts

References

2017 albums
Dan Auerbach albums